Jo Ann Harshbarger (born November 17, 1956) is an American former competition swimmer and world record-holder.  Harshbarger competed at the 1972 Summer Olympics in Munich, Germany, and was a silver medalist in the 800-meter freestyle at the 1973 World Aquatics Championships in Belgrade, Yugoslavia.  She set world records in the 800-meter freestyle in 1972 and 1974, and in the 1,500-meter freestyle in 1973.

See also
 List of Stanford University people
 List of World Aquatics Championships medalists in swimming (women)
 World record progression 800 metres freestyle
 World record progression 1500 metres freestyle

References
 

1956 births
Living people
American female freestyle swimmers
World record setters in swimming
Olympic swimmers of the United States
Sportspeople from Aurora, Illinois
Stanford Cardinal women's swimmers
Swimmers at the 1972 Summer Olympics
World Aquatics Championships medalists in swimming